Charles Alexander King (born 15 November 1979) is a former Scottish professional footballer and current manager of Tynecastle. He had a playing career in the Scottish Football League for several clubs.

A striker, King began his career with St Johnstone in 1996. He remained at McDiarmid Park for three years, making just four league appearances.

In June 1999 he joined Livingston, after being on loan to the Almondvale club the previous season. In all, he made 59 league appearances for Livi, scoring ten goals.

After a loan period at Stirling Albion during the 2000–01 season, he joined Brechin City that spring. Before being released, he was the longest-serving player at the club. He was released on May 6, 2012, by the Brechin City manager at the time, Jim Weir, much to the shock and disappointment of both himself and Brechin fans. He scored his last goal for the club the day before in a 4–2 defeat to Dumbarton.

He joined neighbours Forfar Athletic on a one-year deal on 6 June 2012.

King took his first step into management in May 2013, with his appointment as player-manager of Junior side Brechin Victoria. He left Vics in December 2016, and was appointed as assistant to Broughty Athletic manager Keith Gibson, before succeeding John Ovenstone as Tayport manager in July 2017. King parted company with Tayport in October 2018.

He was appointed manager of St Andrews United in 2020 after serving as assistant manager for two seasons.

King was appointed as manager of Tynecastle in 2021.

Honours
 Scottish Division Three winner 2001–02
 Scottish Division Two winner 2004–05

References

External links

Profile at PlayerHistory.com

1979 births
Living people
Footballers from Edinburgh
Scottish footballers
St Johnstone F.C. players
Ross County F.C. players
Livingston F.C. players
Stirling Albion F.C. players
Brechin City F.C. players
Forfar Athletic F.C. players
Scottish Football League players
Association football forwards
Scottish football managers
Scottish Junior Football Association players
Brechin Victoria F.C. players
St Andrews United F.C. players
Tynecastle F.C. managers